Lee McLaughlin (4 May 1936 – 20 September 2007)  was an American stunt man and film and television actor from Pennsylvania.  He had small roles in the television shows Bonanza, Starsky & Hutch, CHiPs and Fantasy Island and the films Bound for Glory, Silver Streak, The Car and Elvira, Mistress of the Dark.

Biography
McLaughlin was born on in Chester, Pennsylvania. His acting career began in 1969 with a bit part in "Bonanza" which was the first of three appearances on the show. He had small roles in Up Your Alley in 1971, "Starsky & Hutch" in 1975, and Silver Streak and Bound For Glory in 1976. He returned to television with other small roles, including "Switch", "One Day at a Time", "Starsky & Hutch", and "CHiPs", as well as a bit part in the film The Car, in 1977.

In 1978, he did "Fantasy Island", his third and final "Starsky & Hutch", and The Cheap Detective.

His final acting credit was 2003's Greasewood Flat.

McLaughlin died 20 September 2007 in Northridge, California.

Filmography

Notes

1936 births
2007 deaths
20th-century American male actors
21st-century American male actors
American male television actors
People from Chester, Pennsylvania
Male actors from Pennsylvania